Presentation Convent Senior Secondary School is an ISO-certified school in Delhi, which is affiliated to the Central Board of Secondary Education. It is known for its Environmental Management System (EMS) and Quality Management System (QMS).

History
The Presentation Congregation was founded by Nano Nagle in Ireland in 1775. The pioneering efforts of this charismatic lady providing quality education, became a world phenomenon through the dedicated lives of the Presentation Sisters. 

The school in Delhi-6 was started in 1924 by Fr. Luke O.F.M. Cap. with 13 students in a tent, under the Diocese of Shimla-Chandigarh. On 8 December 1939 Bishop Sylvester Mulligan OFM Cap. invited the Presentation Sisters from Rawalpindi, Pakistan, to take over the management of the school. The first three pioneer sisters who came to Delhi were Sr. Gabriel, Sr. Augustine and Sr. Michael. The school was co-ed, followed Cambridge syllabus and catered to children of the British garrison and railway employees. It opted for ISCE in 1963 till 1976 and later was affiliated to CBSE. Another school by the name of St. Francis Xavier's was introduced in 1950 to cater to Hindi speaking children. On 1 April 1987, there was an amalgamation of St. Francis Xavier's School and St. Theresa School under the banner of Presentation Convent Sr. Sec. School, affiliated to CBSE.

It was one of the first schools to venture out for Open Learning System by getting it accredited to National Open School.

Activities
 ECO Club
 Y.C.S.
 Leadership Training For Service
 Martial Arts
 Sports
 Yoga 
 Dance
 Music 
 Outreach programme
 Art Club

See also
Education in India
Education in Delhi
List of schools in Delhi
 CBSE

References

External links

http://www.pcsdelhi.in/about-history-presentation-convent.php

Presentation Sisters schools
Catholic secondary schools in India
Christian schools in Delhi
High schools and secondary schools in Delhi